Vocalion Records is an American record company and label.

History
The label was founded in 1916 by the Aeolian Company, a maker of pianos and organs, as Aeolian-Vocalion; the company also sold phonographs under the Vocalion name. "Aeolian" was later dropped from the label's name. In late 1924, the label was acquired by Brunswick Records. During the 1920s, Vocalion also began the 1000 race series, records recorded by and marketed to African Americans. Jim Jackson recorded "Jim Jackson's Kansas City Blues" for Vocalion in 1927. It sold exceptionally well, and the song became a blues standard for musicians from Memphis and Mississippi. The label issued Robert Johnson's "Cross Road Blues"

The name Vocalion was resurrected in the late 1950s by American Decca as a budget label for back-catalog reissues. This incarnation of Vocalion ceased operations in 1973; however, its replacement as MCA's budget imprint, Coral Records, kept many Vocalion titles in print. In 1975, MCA reissued five albums on the Vocalion label.

References

External links
 History of Brunswick and Vocalion
 Vocalion album discography from BSN Pubs
 "Maybe it's obscure, but if it's good, we'll issue it."
 Vocalion Records on the Internet Archive's Great 78 Project

American record labels
Record labels established in 1916
Record labels disestablished in 1940
Re-established companies
Jazz record labels
Blues record labels
1916 establishments in the United States
1940 disestablishments in the United States